The Lions was a special police unit for fast interventions formed by the Ministry of Internal Affairs of North Macedonia in 2001. It was dissolved in 2004.

History

Persons of note
Goran Stojkov, police general
Goran Georgievski Mujo, police commander
Toni Mihajlovski, spokesman
Oliver Petrushevski, KIA (†2001)

See also
 North Macedonia
 Macedonian Police
Albanian terrorism in North Macedonia
Special Operations Unit - Tigers
Border Police
Alpha
Special Support Unit
Lake Patrol

References

Specialist law enforcement agencies of North Macedonia